KKWQ 92.5, is a small local radio station broadcasting from the border town of Warroad, Minnesota. It is owned and operated by Border Broadcasting, along with sister station KRWB. They share studios at 113 Lake St NW, in Warroad. The transmitter site is SW of Warroad on Country Road 12. A 100,000 watt transmitter and 460 foot tower gives them a large coverage area covering NW Minnesota, including the Northwest Angle and parts of Manitoba and Ontario.

Its format is country music, and they broadcast 24 hours a day.

External links
 

Radio stations in Minnesota
Country radio stations in the United States